Xerophyllum is a genus of perennial plants from the family Melanthiaceae. The genus is native to North America.

There are two species:
Xerophyllum asphodeloides (Pursh) Nutt. - southern Appalachians from Alabama to Maryland; also Delaware + New Jersey
Xerophyllum tenax (Pursh) Nutt. - Alberta, British Columbia, Montana, Idaho, Wyoming, Washington, Oregon, N + W California

Some species formerly placed in this genus have been transferred to others (within the tribe Melanthieae):
Xerophyllum gramineum = Stenanthium gramineum (Ker Gawl.) Morong
Xerophyllum sabadilla = Schoenocaulon officinale (Schltdl. & Cham.) A.Gray

The elongated leaves of X. tenax, commonly known as bear grass, are used for basket weaving by the Native Americans. Xerophyllum asphodeloides, also known as turkey's beard, is a popular garden plant, producing spikes of white flowers.

References

External links
 Xerophyllum asphodeloides growing in the wild in the Linville Gorge Wilderness Area.

Melanthiaceae
Melanthiaceae genera
Flora of North America